Antonio Muñoz (born Jose Rafael Antonio Muñoz, January 2, 1966, in Guatemala City) is a Guatemalan actor and three-time national motocross champion.

He started racing motorcross when he was eleven. During his third year of racing, he suffered a major accident, leaving him with major facial trauma and permanent loss of taste and smell called anosmia. Muñoz competed for twenty years as a motorcross racer and held three national titles.

In 2002, he decided to pursue a career in acting, although he had no previous experience and within days he became a member of the Screen Actors Guild.

Antonio had his first break after six months. Desmond Gumbs, the director of Straight Out (2003), (his first film) took a great risk on Muñoz's raw talent and cast him in a major plot-driver role. Since then, he has worked on top-rated shows, as well as in the feature films, The Rundown, Spanglish  with Adam Sandler, and London.

He has been in television and editorial commercials including Bank of America, Nissan Altima and Infinity Insurance.

He then tried to pursue an acting career in the Hispanic-Latin market and he was soon given a feature role in the Telemundo production, El Rostro de Analía as a hitman for Gabriel Porras as Ricky Montana.

In June 2010, Antonio is worked in Petén with Dr Richard D. Hansen, providing all the logistic and helicopters for the exploration of El Mirador, the largest Mayan ruins.

Television

Film

References

External links
Official Facebook page
IMDb 
Manolo A Estrada, "Un final feliz, aún por escribirse..." Carretera News, 20 June - 3 July 2009, pp 16-17 

https://web.archive.org/web/20131213144022/http://www.debate.org/reference/guatemala-city
https://web.archive.org/web/20090309122951/http://the1secondfilm.com/producer/3369
http://www.makethemostoflife.net/2011/01/26/believe-in-yourself-2/
http://www.sorayaalcala.com/columna/2008/estilos130/
http://www.elsalvador.com/mwedh/nota/nota_completa.asp?idCat=6461&idArt=3623108
http://www.motivateus.com/stories/believeinyou.htm

Living people
1966 births
Guatemalan male stage actors
Guatemalan male telenovela actors
Guatemalan male television actors
Guatemalan motorcycle racers
21st-century Guatemalan male actors